Endotricha eximia is a species of snout moth in the genus Endotricha. It is found in China (Guizhou, Sichuan) and India (Sikkim).

References

Moths described in 1963
Endotrichini